= The Other's Gold =

2019 novel by Elizabeth Ames

- First edition
- Author: Elizabeth Ames
- Language: English
- Publisher: Viking books
- Publication date: 2019
- ISBN: 978-1-9848-7849-6 (first edition, hardcover)
- Dewey Decimal: 811.6
- LC Class: PS3601.M477 O86

The Other's Gold is the first novel by American writer Elizabeth Ames. It was published in 2019 by Viking Books. The plot focuses on the friendship and lives of four women, Margaret, Alice, Ji Sun, and Lainey, who meet as university students at Quincy-Hawthorne College in 2002. The novel follows the four women throughout their lives, including during the Occupy Wall Street protests.

== Reception ==
Publishers Weekly stated that when the characters make "bad decisions" the author does not often have characters face "sufficient retribution", and the review states "the tangents about their lives become distracting." The publication argued that "most readers will feel frustrated by the meandering plot and the characters’ choices." It praised the "well drawn" "details and emotional crises" and the "moments of powerful emotion".

Kirkus Reviews criticized the first portion of the novel for its tendency to "sometimes blur the characters together within its slippery point of view" but later noted that "the novel sharpens when the women come into independent adulthood" and that "the characters finally bloom into vibrant individuality". Kirkus concluded that the book is "messy, but ultimately memorable".
